Parliamentary elections were held in Burundi on 23 July 2010. The opposition parties boycotted the election after also boycotting the presidential election.

The ruling National Council for the Defense of Democracy – Forces for the Defense of Democracy gained 81 of the 106 seats, while the Union for National Progress gained 17 seats. Another smaller party won five seats, while the remaining three seats are reserved for the Twa minority.

Results

National Assembly

Senate
The Senate was elected on 28 July by electoral colleges composed of local councillors.

References

Elections in Burundi
Burundi
2010 in Burundi
Election and referendum articles with incomplete results